The SILLIAC (Sydney version of the Illinois Automatic Computer, i.e. the Sydney ILLIAC), an early computer built by the University of Sydney, Australia, was based on the ILLIAC and ORDVAC computers developed at the University of Illinois.

Like other early computers, SILLIAC was physically large. The computer itself was a single large cabinet 2.5 m high, 3 m wide and 0.6 m deep in one room. Its power supply occupied a second room and air conditioning required an additional room in the basement.

It ran until May 17, 1968 when it was replaced by a faster and bigger machine. Although it was then broken up, some pieces of SILLIAC are at the Powerhouse Museum and others are displayed at Sydney University.

History
SILLIAC had its genesis in late 1953 when Harry Messel, the dynamic new head of the School of Physics, and John Blatt, newly arrived researcher, both independently realised that the School needed an electronic computer as a tool for theoretical physics.  Whilst the first computer in the southern hemisphere, the CSIR Mk 1, was already running elsewhere on the University of Sydney grounds, there were several serious impediments to its use by the School of Physics:  The CSIR Mk 1 was fully occupied with CSIR research and John Blatt found its staff very unhelpful; and, as a serial architecture computer, it was far too slow for the sort of problems that Blatt and Messel envisaged.  The solution was for the School to build its own computer.

Rather than design a computer from scratch, Blatt and Messel chose to copy the design of the ILLIAC for which the University of Illinois were happy to provide plans and assistance. John Algie, then maintenance engineer for CSIRAC, estimated the cost at AU£35,200, which was approximately ten times the cost of a Sydney suburban house at the time.  Based on this, a decision to proceed was made at the end of 1953. A mutual friend introduced Messel to Adolph Basser, who donated AU£50,000 towards the computer.  SILLIAC's eventual cost was AU£75,000.

In July 1954, Standard Telephones and Cables was contracted to build the computer, with testing and installation performed by technicians within the School of Physics.

SILLIAC's first scientific computation was carried out by PhD student Bob May (later Robert May, Baron May of Oxford) in June 1956, after self tests had been completed successfully.  Users were provided with regular access from July 9, with the official opening conducted on September 12.

Barry de Ferranti, a pioneer involved in the construction of SILLIAC described the main cabinet of the computer as about 2 metres high, 1 metre deep and 5 metres long with glass panels at the front and light switches that indicated what was going on inside.

It ran until May 17, 1968 when it was replaced by a faster and bigger machine. SILLIAC has now been broken up into pieces with parts of it placed on display in the Chau Chak Wing Museum, which opened in November 2020.

Hardware specifications 
 Parallel, asynchronous operation.  Approximately 13,000 adds, 1400 multiplies or 1200 divides per second
 Memory: 1024 words of 40 bits using 40 Williams tubes
 Two 20-bit instructions per word.
 Approximately 150 operations on 2 registers
 Paper tape input at 200 characters per second (cps), paper tape output at about 50 cps or teleprinter output at 10 cps.  Four magnetic tape units added in 1958
 Initially 2768 valves. Increased to 2911 during 1958 upgrade
 Power consumption: 35 kW
 Average of 11 hours between failures

Like most of the IAS family, SILLIAC was not an exact copy of ILLIAC. One important change was the use of 2C51 valves in place of the more common 6J6. The 2C51 had been developed by Bell Labs for use in undersea telephone repeaters and had about 5 times the life (for 6 times the cost).  This decision significantly improved the reliability of SILLIAC compared to its contemporaries.

Conservation 
Some pieces of SILLIAC are at the Powerhouse Museum and others are displayed at Sydney University.

In March 2008, the Australian Computer Museum Society was seeking alternative storage, or risked its collection, including important components of SILLIAC, being scrapped.

See also
 CSIR Mk 1, Sydney University's first computer
 List of vacuum-tube computers

References

External links 
 The Science Show about SILLIAC
 David Green's SILLIAC page - Programming Manuals and an emulator
 Description and Image of a Component in the collection of the Powerhouse Museum

IAS architecture computers
Vacuum tube computers
University of Sydney